Cerro de Pasco is a city in central Peru, located at the top of the Andean Mountains. It is the capital of both the Pasco Province and the Department of Pasco, and an important mining center of silver, copper, zinc and lead. Its urban area is formed by the districts of Chaupimarca, Yanacancha and Simón Bolívar.

Mining center 

Cerro de Pasco became one of the world's richest silver producing areas after silver was discovered there in 1630. It is still an active mining center.
The Spanish mined the rich Cerro de Pasco silver-bearing oxide ore deposits since colonial times. Sulfide minerals are more common in the Atacocha district however.

Francisco Uville arranged for steam engines made by Richard Trevithick of Cornwall, England, to be installed in Cerro de Pasco in 1816 to pump water from the mines and allow lower levels to be reached.
However, fighting in the Peruvian War of Independence brought production to a halt from 1820 to 1825.

Three major mines in the area include the Machcan, Atacocha, and Milpo.  Silver ore occurs in hydrothermal veins or as sulfides and clay minerals replacing the Jurassic Pucara limestone.  Porphyry dacite stocks are found intruded near the Atacocha and Milpo mines along the Atacocha Fault.  Compania Minera Atacocha started operations at the Atacocha Mine in 1936.  Ore minerals include galena and sphalerite.

Contamination of the environment by lead, cadmium and other heavy metals has precipitated a public health crisis in the city, but a 2006 law proposing to evacuate all inhabitants and relocate the city has not yet culminated in concrete action.

Geography

Climate 
The city is the largest in the world with this classification. 
Cerro de Pasco has humid, damp and cloudy summers with frequent rainfall and dry, sunny winters with cool to cold temperatures throughout the year. Snowfall occurs sporadically during any season, most commonly around dawn.

Places of Interest 
The local soccer field, Daniel Alcides Carrión Stadium, is one of the highest altitude sports stadiums in the world.

Notable people
 Daniel Alcides Carrión

See also
Yanacocha
Toquepala mine

References 

Populated places in the Pasco Region
Regional capital cities in Peru